Guney in Iran may refer to:
 Guney, Golestan
 Guney, Zanjan